Judge James Edwin Horton (1878 – March 1973) was a Circuit Judge for the Eighth Circuit Court in Alabama. He was elected in 1922 and again in 1928.

Birth and education
Judge Horton was born January 4, 1878, the son of James Horton, Sr. and Emily Donelson. His mother was the great-niece of former President of the United States Andrew Jackson. His family bible shows he was born in Limestone County, AL. At some point during his childhood he moved to Athens, Alabama.

He had no formal education until the age of eight or nine. He was a sickly child and had to rely on his mother's care. Nothing has been known about Judge Horton's high school education. The next record of him appeared when he enrolled in Vanderbilt University's medical studies program. His decision to become a doctor was influenced by his father.

After a year Horton decided that medicine was not for him and transferred to Cumberland University in Lebanon, Tennessee and gained his  B.A. in 1897.  At Cumberland School of Law he earned his Bachelor of Law degree in 1899. Horton's clerked for his father, a Probate Judge, before entering into a private practice.

Career
Judge Horton served one term in the Alabama State Legislature from 1910–1914. Following this he served in the Alabama State Senate. His term as a Senator was cut short when a chancery court opening appeared, which he took.

He eventually left his seat on the chancery court, returning to his old law practice and farming his land. He continued with this life for some time, before being elected judge of the Eighth Circuit Court, as noted above. It was during his second term that Judge Horton got the most important case of his career: the re-trials of the Scottsboro Boys.

Scottsboro Boys re-trials

Judge Horton presided over the re-trials of the Scottsboro Boys. Both the prosecution and defense agreed with his choice. Numerous comparisons were made in the media to his resemblance to former President Abraham Lincoln. He was represented as the perfect man for the job. However, much to the prosecution's dismay, Judge Horton issued a startling rebuke to the State's case after a conviction and death penalty were handed down against Haywood Patterson. To quote:

After handing down this statement, Judge Horton was taken off the case by the Alabama Supreme Court. In his place, the State put Judge William Washington Callahan.

End of career
The year after Judge Horton's statement, he lost his re-election bid to Aquilla Griffith. He then retired to his farm and tried to live a quiet life. This was disturbed in March 1934, when he sold the Tennessee Valley Authority his land so that they could build the Wheeler Dam.

Using the proceeds of this sale, Judge Horton and his wife, Anna Hobbs Horton, pooled their money and bought  of land in Greenbrier, Alabama. He then took his wife's family home in Athens apart piece-by-piece and reassembled it in Greenbrier.

At Greenbrier, he devoted his time to farming. He raised cotton, corn, and soybeans, as well as the largest herd of Aberdeen-Angus cattle in Alabama.

He died in March 1973 at 95. He is immortalized in a bronze plaque on a wall just outside of the courtroom where he heard the Scottsboro cases:So far as the law is concerned it knows neither native nor alien, Jew nor Gentile, black nor white.  This case is no different from any other.  We have only to do our duty without fear or favor.A statue of Judge Horton, made of bronze, stands on the west side of the Limestone County courthouse.  Several members of the local community initiated the Judge Horton statue project, which was completed and unveiled in October 2017.

References

External links
Profile of Judge James Horton. Jr., Scottsboro Judge
Scottsboro: An American Tragedy (PBS)
Judge Horton's Statement
Judge William Washington Callahan

Alabama state court judges
1930s in the United States
1931 in the United States
1878 births
1973 deaths
People from Limestone County, Alabama